"Pam Pam" is a single by Wisin & Yandel from the deluxe edition of their fifth studio album Pa'l Mundo Deluxe Edition. The song reached big recognition in many Spanish-speaking countries and among Latin community in the United States.

On October 26, 2006, "Pam Pam" took the number-one spot on the United States Billboard Hot Latin Tracks chart from David Bisbal's "¿Quién Me Iba a Decir?" The song samples "Llorando se fue" by Bolivian group Los Kjarkas. The catchy song was performed in the Latin Grammy Awards in New York, broadcast by Univisión. The remix of "Pam Pam" features Romeo Santos of bachata group Aventura.

Music video
The music video of "Pam Pam" was shot in Brazil where Wisin y Yandel appear in beaches, parties and cultural places. The clip was filmed in 36 hours, with Brazilian team and cast. The production was made by the producer Thiago Arraes and directed by David Impelluso. It has been viewed over 123 million times on YouTube.

Charts

Weekly charts

Year-end charts

References

2005 songs
2006 singles
Wisin & Yandel songs
Spanish-language songs
Song recordings produced by Luny Tunes
Machete Music singles